Kent S. McKinley (March 25, 1898 – October 1972) was an American politician. He served as a Republican member for the 118th district of the Florida House of Representatives.

McKinley was born in Adams, New York, and attended Dartmouth College. At the age of 17 he was an actor, director and writer at a summer stock theater in Buffalo, New York. McKinley was director of the Buffalo, New York daily newspaper The Buffalo News. He was also the founder and editor of The Sarasota News.

In 1967, McKinley was elected as a member for the newly established 118th district of the Florida House of Representatives. He was succeeded by Donald E. Heath in 1968 after he decided not to seek re-election because of ill-health.

McKinley died in October 1972 of a heart attack at his summer home, at the age of 74.

References 

1898 births
1972 deaths
People from Adams, New York
Republican Party members of the Florida House of Representatives
20th-century American politicians
Dartmouth College alumni
Florida Southern College alumni
American editors
American newspaper people
American male stage actors
20th-century American male actors
American producers
American male writers
20th-century American male writers
American directors